Kurbaan is an Indian Hindi-language drama film directed by Deepak Bahry, starring Salman Khan and Ayesha Jhulka. The film, which was released on 31 May 1991, marked Ayesha Jhulka's Hindi debut.

It is a love story with a backdrop of violence. The film had stalwarts Sunil Dutt and Kabir Bedi pitted against each other in the form of a dacoit and a top cop. Their children fall in love in each other and thus begins a major second confrontation between the two biggies amidst the obstacles faced by the young lovers in the course of their love against all odds. Kurbaan declare 5th consecutive hit film of Salman Khan after Maine Pyar Kiya, Baaghi, Sanam Bewafa, Patthar Ke Phool.

Plot
Maan Singh and the honest Prithvi Singh are engaged in a legal property dispute. When the Court gives verdict in Prithvi's favor, Maan Singh, in a fit of rage, hires a renowned bandit, Panna Singh, to eliminate Prithvi's entire family. Panna partly succeeds, and escapes wounded to a forest to escape Prithvi's fury. Prithvi loses his sister, wife and other members of his family due to the attack, and vows to avenge by killing Maan Singh's family in return, and he does it with partial success.

Maan Singh's brother, the Police Inspector Suraj Singh, who incidentally was Prithvi's trusted and best friend testifies against Prithvi in the case of carnage as his duty. This however upsets Prithvi to no end and puts an end to their friendship.

Prithvi escapes prison, plunders and takes over Panna Singh's gang and becomes Daku Prithvi Singh. The only survivors from his family are his daughter, Chanda, his former housekeeper Kaaki, and her son, Himmat. He goes into hiding with his gang and family.

On the other side, Inspector Suraj Singh lives with his son, Akash. Years later, an educated Akash returns and while visiting a local fair spots an uneducated Chanda and they both fall in love with each other.

When their respective fathers find out, they are enraged and prohibit the young lovers from seeing each other by locking them up and their marriages are fixed elsewhere.

Both Akash and Chanda believe in their love, and stage their escape but are unaware of the consequences- another bloodbath at the hands of the vengeful Panna Singh is on the horizon, as he wants to kill Prithvi and his remaining family.

Cast 

 Sunil Dutt as  Thakur/Dacait Prithvi Singh
 Kabir Bedi as Thakur Suraj Singh, Supritendent of Police
 Salman Khan as Akash Suraj Singh
 Ayesha Jhulka as Chanda Prithvi Singh
 Kunika as Gayatri Prithvi Singh
 Swapna as Suraj Singh Wife
 Urmila Bhatt as Prithvi Singh Mother
 Sudha Chandran as Prithvi Singh sister
 Subbiraj as Prithvi lawyer Gupta
 Gulshan Grover as Himmat Singh
 Rohini Hattangadi as Kaaki Maa
 Bharat Kapoor as Thakur Maan Singh, Suraj Singh Brother
 Goga Kapoor as  Dacait Panna Singh
 Surendra Pal as Panna Singh brother
 Rajesh Puri as Police Sub Inspector
 Sunil Dhawan as Public Prosecutor
 Kamaldeep as Judge
Ranjeet Special Appearance in the song "Deewano Se Poocho Mohabbat hai kya?"
Sahila Chadha Special Appearance in the song "Zuba Zuba"

Production 
Salman Khan was apprehensive about dancing in the film.

Soundtrack

External links

References

1990s Hindi-language films
1991 films
Films scored by Anand–Milind
Films shot in Shillong
Indian drama films
Films directed by Deepak Bahry